Port Alma Wind Farm is a large wind farm project located on the north shore of Lake Erie in the Municipality of Chatham–Kent, Ontario, Canada.

It began generating electricity in November, 2008. It is owned and operated by Kruger Energy. The power will be fed into the Ontario electricity market administered by the Independent Electricity System Operator.

The wind farm consists of forty four Siemens 2.3 (MW) Mark II wind turbines, with an installed capacity of 101.2 (MW). It is capable of generating approx. 300 (GWh) annually, which will produce enough energy to power 30,000 households.Port Alma Current Output

The project study area is approx. 285 km2 centred on Port Alma.

See also

List of wind farms in Canada
List of offshore wind farms

References

External links
http://www.krugerenergie.com/port_alma/en/information.htm
http://www.powerauthority.on.ca/Page.asp?PageID=924&ContentID=5102
https://web.archive.org/web/20091021071549/http://iw.kruger.com/KrugerEnergy/port_alma/index_A.htm
Sygration Ontario Hourly Generator Output
 Independent Electricity System Operator (IESO) website

Wind farms in Ontario